Saint Paul's Cathedral is a cathedral church on the island of St Helena and is part of the Diocese of St Helena. It is located approximately 2 miles south of Jamestown in the district of St Paul's.

It replaced "the Country Church" which existed from the early days of St Helenian colonisation in the late 17th century. Building work on the new church began in 1850, was completed in 1851 and the church became the cathedral in 1859 when the Diocese of St Helena was established. At the time the diocese included the islands of Ascension and Tristan da Cunha, but the latter has since been transferred away.

It is designated as a Grade I listed building. Nearby is Plantation House, also Grade I listed.

Parish
The parish of St Paul's Cathedral (one of three parishes on the island) consists of Saint Paul's Cathedral and four daughter churches:
 Saint Andrew's, Half Tree Hollow
 Saint Helena of the Cross, Blue Hill
 Saint Martin's in the Hills, Thompsons Hill
 Saint Peter's, Sandy Bay

See also

Saint James's Church - the oldest Anglican church in the southern hemisphere, situated in Jamestown
Saint Matthew, Hutt's Gate

Gallery

References

External links
Diocese of Saint Helena Parish of St Paul
Plantation House with the old Country Church behind, c. 1812

1851 establishments in the British Empire
Anglican cathedrals in Africa
Churches completed in 1851
Church buildings in Saint Helena
Grade I listed buildings in Saint Helena
Jamestown, Saint Helena
Parishes of Saint Helena